is an elevated station, located in Meguro, Tokyo, connected with Tokyu Toyoko Line.

History
Gakugei-daigaku Station opened on 28 August 1927.

Lines
It is located 4.2 km from the terminus of the line at Shibuya.

Station layout
This elevated station consists of a single island platform serving two tracks.

Platforms

Passenger statistics
In fiscal year 2018, the station was used by an average of 78,251 passengers daily.

References

External links

See also
 List of railway stations in Japan

Railway stations in Japan opened in 1927
Tokyu Toyoko Line
Stations of Tokyu Corporation
Railway stations in Tokyo
Buildings and structures in Meguro